The 2016–17 Bradley Braves women's basketball team represents Bradley University during the 2016–17 NCAA Division I women's basketball season. The Braves, led by first year head coach Andrea Gorski. The Braves are members of the Missouri Valley Conference and play their home games at Renaissance Coliseum. They finished the season 12–19, 7–11 in MVC play to finish in sixth place. They advanced to the quarterfinals of the Missouri Valley women's tournament where they lost to Northern Iowa.

Roster

Schedule

|-
! colspan="9" style="background:#a50000; color:#fff;"|  Exhibition

|-
! colspan="9" style="background:#a50000; color:#fff;"|  Non-conference regular season

|-
! colspan="12" style="background:#a50000; color:#fff;"| Missouri Valley Conference regular season

|-
! colspan="9" style="background:#a50000; color:#fff;"| Missouri Valley Women's Tournament

See also
2015–16 Bradley Braves men's basketball team

References

Bradley Braves women's basketball seasons
Bradley
Bradley
Bradley